The Vander Veer Botanical Park is a  botanical garden in the Vander Veer Park Historic District of Davenport, Iowa. It is believed to be one of the first botanical parks west of the Mississippi River. The park was listed on the Davenport Register of Historic Properties on August 4, 1993.

History
Vander Veer Park was established in 1885. The city of Davenport purchased the land for $13,000 ($ in  dollars). The park was built on the old Scott County Fairgrounds land and modeled after New York City’s Central Park. Vander Veer was originally named Central Park. In 1912 the park was renamed after the first secretary of the Davenport Park Board of Commissioners, A.W. Vander Veer. A conservatory, music pavilion, and decorative fountains were added after World War I.

The park is currently maintained by a nonprofit organization, The Friends of Vander Veer.

Gallery

See also 
 List of botanical gardens in the United States

References

External links

 The Friends of Vander Veer

Botanical gardens in Iowa
Davenport Register of Historic Properties
Parks in Davenport, Iowa
Parks on the National Register of Historic Places in Iowa
National Register of Historic Places in Davenport, Iowa
1885 establishments in Iowa